Veracruz Sporting Club is a Mexican football team from Veracruz, Veracruz State, playing in the Tercera División de México. They were one of Liga MX's inaugural members.

History 

The club was founded in 1908 by the native Spaniards living in Veracruz in the early 1900s. The first owners were the brothers Ángel and Mariano Rivera. The club played in the old Liga amateur de Veracruz from 1908 when in 1931 they were invited to pay in the Liga amateur del Distrito Federal after clubs México FC and Real Club España left some spots open due to economical problems.

After the 1920s the Primera Fuerza decided to only admit clubs from the city of Mexico and so the club return to action in the local Liga Amateur de Veracruz where they managed to win 12 titles till the league folded in 1943 after the Mexican league in Mexico city was professionalize and allowed all clubs from the nation to take part in.

In 1942-43 the club merge with cross town rival Iberia de Córdoba and formed  Tiburones Rojos de Veracruz  in order to take part of the 1943 Primera División de México tournament and so came an end to a great club who from 1908 to 1943 played many memorable games and managed to win 12 domestic titles and various friendly matches .

Recent Years
As of 2011 the club has rejoined the Mexican professional federation and enrolled in the Tercera División de México for the Apertura 2011 Tournament.

Honors
Liga Amateur de Veracruz
Winners (11): 1914-15, 1915–16, 1916–17, 1924–25, 1926–27, 1927–28, 1928–29, 1929–30, 1930–31, 1940–41, 1942–43

See also
Football in Mexico
Tiburones Rojos de Veracruz

External links
 medio timepo 

Association football clubs established in 1908
Football clubs in Veracruz
1908 establishments in Mexico
Association football clubs disestablished in 1943
1943 disestablishments in Mexico